The 2021–22 Copa de la Reina was the 37th edition of the Copa de la Reina, Spain's annual field hockey cup competition for women. It was held from 12 to 14 November 2021, at Real Club de Polo in Barcelona.

Club de Campo won the tournament for a record 18th time, defeating Júnior 4–2 in the final. Club Egara finished in third place after defeating UD Taburiente 1–0.

Qualified teams
The tournament was contested by the top eight ranked teams from the first half of the 2021–22 season of the Liga Iberdrola.

Club de Campo
Club Egara
Júnior
Real Club de Polo
Real Sociedad
Sanse Complutense
Sardinero
UD Taburiente

Officials
The following umpires were appointed by the RFEH to officiate the tournament:

Sandra Adell (ESP)
Noelia Blanco (ESP)
Gema Calderón (ESP)
María Mercedes Romero (ESP)
Ana Ortega (ESP)
Cristina Pérez (ESP)
Montserrat Solórzano (ESP)
Laura Trujillo (ESP)

Results

Knockouts

Quarterfinals

First to fourth place classification

Semi-finals

Third and fourth place

Final

Awards

References

External links
Real Federación Española de Hockey

field hockey
field hockey
Spain